WeatherNation TV (branded on-air as simply WeatherNation) is an American broadcast, digital streaming, cable, and satellite television network owned by WeatherNation, Inc, a subsidiary of Performance One Media and ultimately owned by Robert J. Sigg. The network broadcasts live and pre-recorded local, regional, and national weather forecasts and weather-related news, including periodic coverage of severe and tropical weather events. The network's studio facilities, along with its headquarters and master control facilities are located in the Denver suburb of Centennial, Colorado, sharing production facilities with sister network Real America's Voice.

History
WeatherNation was founded by Paul Douglas in 2010.  Robert J. Sigg's Performance One Media in 2010 acquired the WeatherNation trademarks and brand from the original WeatherNation (which eventally became part of AerisWeather), a centralized weather service for local stations and web sites. Broadcast Weather also was hired to provide weather news programming for WeatherNation channel. In March 2011, WeatherNation, Inc. and National Cable Television Cooperative (NCTC) reached a long-term carriage agreement for a national channel for a second quarter 2011 roll out. Performance One Media later gained full ownership and control over WeatherNation following a lawsuit against it in 2014.

WeatherNation would gain its first broadcast television outlet by October 24, 2011, WHDT in Stuart, Florida as its primary affiliation. WIYC in Montgomery, Alabama also started carrying WeatherNation that same month. Further expansion of its broadcast affiliate body continued in January 2012, when WeatherNation added affiliates in Minneapolis, Minnesota (KARE-TV); Little Rock, Arkansas (KMYA-DT); Fort Smith, Arkansas (KFDF-CA); and Springfield, Missouri (KFFS-CA).

Many of WeatherNation TV's initial over-the-air affiliates were low-power and full-power stations that were not affiliated with one of the major broadcast television networks. However, from 2012 to 2014, the network announced piecemeal agreements with two major broadcasting groups to carry WeatherNation on the subchannels of network-affiliated stations (including one which expanded upon an existing affiliation agreement with such a station). During 2013 and 2014, the network expanded its distribution agreement with the Gannett Company, owner of Minneapolis affiliate KARE-TV, to add the network on the subchannels of its stations in cities such as Atlanta (WXIA-TV), Denver (KUSA), and Washington, D.C. (WUSA). On October 27, 2014, WeatherNation TV signed an affiliation agreement with the Sinclair Broadcast Group to carry its programming on a subchannel of the company's flagship station, WBFF in Baltimore.

On January 14, 2014, WeatherNation launched on DirecTV channel 361 as part of a carriage dispute between The Weather Channel and DirecTV. On April 21, 2015, Dish Network announced that it had reached an agreement to add WeatherNation onto its lineup, making it available on channel 215. On August 1, 2018, DirecTV dropped WeatherNation.

On October 12, 2022, it was announced that Proctor & Gamble stopped advertising on WeatherNation after being made aware it was a front for Steve Bannon.

Availability

Broadcast television

, WeatherNation TV has current or pending affiliation agreements with 35 television stations in 33 media markets encompassing 21 states and the District of Columbia. WeatherNation TV is carried primarily on digital subchannels of broadcast television stations and is carried on the digital tiers of select cable providers at the discretion of a local affiliate of the network in most markets. Most of its affiliates are full-power television stations; however WeatherNation TV is carried on low-power stations – mainly through translators of full-power stations that carry the network – in some areas. The national feed's carriage on certain cable and satellite providers is WeatherNation TV's sole method of distribution in markets where an over-the-air affiliate is not present.

WeatherNation TV affiliates, specifically those that operate a news department, have the option of breaking away from the network's programming to carry regularly scheduled programming from the station's primary feed – particularly, programs carried by the station's primary network affiliation – on the subchannel in order to accommodate breaking news or severe weather coverage, or telecasts of locally produced or syndicated sports events on the primary channel (depending on WeatherNation TV's subchannel placement and the station's carriage of additional subchannel services, especially those affiliated with a major network such as The CW or MyNetworkTV).

Although WeatherNation TV maintains a high-definition feed, its broadcast affiliates carry the network in 480i standard-definition in its default 16:9 widescreen format in order to preserve bandwidth to transmit the station's primary channel in high-definition; the HD feed is generally exclusive to certain pay television providers at their preference.

Pay television
WeatherNation TV's national feed began to be carried on satellite provider DirecTV on channel 361 on December 16, 2013; the provider reached a temporary carriage agreement with the network while it was renegotiating its contract with The Weather Channel (which was carried on channel 362). After DirecTV dropped The Weather Channel on January 14, 2014 due to the reasons behind Dish Network's planned removal of the channel in May 2010, the provider replaced The Weather Channel on channel 362 with WeatherNation, which lasted until The Weather Channel and DirecTV struck a new carriage agreement on April 8, 2014 that restored TWC on channel 362; however, WeatherNation TV would continue to be carried on channel 361 until 2018 as a result of a long-term carriage agreement it signed with DirecTV on April 2, one week prior to The Weather Channel agreement.

On April 21, 2015, WeatherNation reached an agreement with Dish Network to be offered to its customers as a six-week preview, and then added to Dish's America's Top 120 programming packages.

On August 1, 2018, DirecTV dropped its carriage of WeatherNation, replacing it with the AccuWeather Network.

Over-the-top providers
Pluto TV added WeatherNation in December 2018.

References

External links
 

Companies based in Centennial, Colorado
English-language television stations in the United States
Television networks in the United States
Weather television networks
Television channels and stations established in 2011